Thomas Centolella is an American poet and educator. He has published four books of poetry and has had many poems published in periodicals including American Poetry Review. He has received awards for his poetry including those from the National poetry Series, the American Book Award, the Lannan Literary Award for Poetry and the Dorset Prize. In 2019, he received a Guggenheim Fellowship.

Life

Centolella has published four books of poetry: Terra Firma, Lights & Mysteries, Views from along the Middle Way, and Almost Human. His poetry has appeared in Alaska Quarterly Review, American Poetry Review, Parthenon West Review, Ploughshares, Poetry Northwest, and The Los Angeles Times, among many other periodicals.  His poem "View #45", was read at the United Nations as a part of Poets Against the War. "In the evening we shall be examined on love" and "Lines of Force" were featured on Garrison Keillor's Writers' Almanac on NPR.

He has been a visiting writer at many universities and colleges.

Mr. Centolella served as a Wallace Stegner Fellow at Stanford University. He has taught literature and creative writing at San Francisco State University, at the University of California, Berkeley (Extension), at the Institute on Aging (San Francisco), at San Francisco WritersCorps, and in the California Poets in the Schools Program.

He currently lives in San Francisco and teaches at College of Marin and in private workshops.

Awards
 1990 National Poetry Series (selected by Denise Levertov)
 1991 American Book Award from the Before Columbus Foundation, and Bay Area Book Reviewers Award (aka, Northern California Book Award).
 1992 Lannan Literary Award for Poetry.
 1996 Poetry Medal from the Commonwealth Club of California (aka California Book Award).
 2015 The Dorset Prize, (selected by Edward Hirsch),Tupelo Press.
 2019 Guggenheim Fellowship

Work

Books
 
 
 
Almost Human. Tupelo Press, 2017.

Anthologies
 America, We Call Your Name: Poems of Resistance and Resilience, Sixteen Rivers Press (2018)
 The Place That Inhabits Us: Poems of the San Francisco Bay Watershed, Sixteen Rivers Press (2010)

Editor

Poetry
 
 
 "View #45", poemhunter
 "The Secret Life," Poetry Northwest, 
 10 poems,https://www.poetryfoundation.org/poets/thomas-centolella

References

Stanford University alumni
UC Berkeley Extension faculty
College of Marin faculty
American male poets
Year of birth missing (living people)
Living people
American Book Award winners